Moodie Hill is a small affluent suburb consisting of four roads; Springhill Road, Springhill Close, Van Meurs Avenue and a small section of Coleraine Drive. It is situated in Johannesburg, Region E of the City of Johannesburg Metropolitan Municipality, Sandton. South Africa.

History
The suburb was originally a working farm before Sandton City began being built in the early 1970s. The original farmhouse is still standing albeit completely restored and renovated. Adjacent to the original plot is a stand which incorporates a house built by renowned Staatliches Bauhaus student and architect Steffen Ahrends.

Location
Situated between Riverclub, Benmore Gardens, Parkmore and Morningside, Gauteng. The purlieus of Moodie Hill is in close proximity to Lycée Jules Verne (South Africa), the Morningside Post Office and the River Club golf course.

Notable residents
 Johnny Clegg  <small>
 Mswati III, King of Swaziland
Eddie Keizan

References

Johannesburg Region E